Salagam (pronounced sālagam) is a ragam in Carnatic music (musical scale of South Indian classical music). It is the 37th melakarta rāgam in the 72 melakarta rāgam system of Carnatic music. It is called Sowgandini in Muthuswami Dikshitar school of Carnatic music.

Structure and Lakshana

It is the 1st rāgam in the 7th chakra Rishi. The mnemonic name is Rishi-Pa. The mnemonic phrase is sa ra ga mi pa dha na. Its  structure (ascending and descending scale) is as follows (see swaras in Carnatic music for details on below notation and terms):
: 
: 

In this scale, the notes shuddha rishabham, shuddha gandharam, prati madhyamam, shuddha dhaivatham and shuddha nishadham are used. As Salagam is a melakarta rāgam, by definition it is a sampoorna rāgam (has all seven notes in ascending and descending scale). It is the prati madhyamam equivalent of Kanakangi, which is the first melakarta.

Janya rāgams 
Salagam has a minor janya rāgam (derived scale) associated with it. See List of janya rāgams for full list of rāgams associated with Salagam and other melakartas.

Compositions
A few compositions set to Salagam scale are:

Ganamrudham by Koteeswara Iyer
VĀraÑa vadanam by Dr. M. Balamuralikrishna

Film Compositions 

Adheera Adheera Song - Cobra - Ajay Gnanamuthu - A.R.Rahman  (Anya Swaram G3,N3)

Related rāgams
This section covers the theoretical and scientific aspect of this rāgam.

Salagam's notes when shifted using Graha bhedam, yields no other melakarta rāgam, like all 6 rāgams in the Rishi chakra (Jalarnavam, Jhalavarali, Navaneetam, Pavani and Raghupriya being the other 5). Only these rāgams have a gap of 3 notes anywhere in their scale, between G1 to M2. Such a gap does not occur in any other melakarta by definition. Graha bhedam is the step taken in keeping the relative note frequencies same, while shifting the shadjam to the next note in the rāgam.

Notes

References

Melakarta ragas